Kaarlo Olavi Kangasniemi (born 4 February 1941) is a retired Finnish weightlifter. Between 1968 and 1972 he won one Olympic, two world and two European titles in the 90 kg division, becoming the only Finnish weightlifter to win either an Olympic or world title. In the same period he set 16 ratified world records: four in the press, seven in the snatch and five in the total. He placed sixth at the 1972 Olympics and seventh in 1964. Kangasniemi was chosen as the world's best weightlifter in 1969 and as the Finnish Sports Personality of the Year in 1968 and 1969. After retiring from senior competitions in 1973 he worked as a weightlifting coach and weightlifting commentator with Eurosport; he continued competing in the masters category, winning a world title and setting a clean and jerk world record. In 1987 he was a candidate to the Parliament of Finland from the Finnish Rural Party, but was not elected. In 1998 he was inducted into the International Weightlifting Federation Hall of Fame.

Kangasniemi was born to a blacksmith and had seven brothers and three sisters. Four of his brothers were Finnish champions in weightlifting, and one, Kauko, competed at the Olympics. The Kangasniemi brothers had a rivalry at the national championships with the four Kailajärvi brothers.

References

External links 
 

1941 births
Living people
People from Ulvila
Finnish male weightlifters
Olympic weightlifters of Finland
Weightlifters at the 1964 Summer Olympics
Weightlifters at the 1968 Summer Olympics
Weightlifters at the 1972 Summer Olympics
Olympic gold medalists for Finland
Olympic medalists in weightlifting
Medalists at the 1968 Summer Olympics
European Weightlifting Championships medalists
World Weightlifting Championships medalists
Sportspeople from Satakunta
20th-century Finnish people
21st-century Finnish people